The Men's marathon T11 was a marathon event in athletics at the 1996 Summer Paralympics, for visually impaired athletes. Waldemar Kikolski and Tomasz Chmurzynski finished in gold and silver medal positions respectively for Poland, ensuring that Kikolski won his first marathon title. Of the eleven starters, ten reached the finish line.

Results

See also
 Marathon at the Paralympics

References 

Men's marathon T11
1996 marathons
Marathons at the Paralympics
Men's marathons